RAC otherwise known as Repository of Antibiotic resistance Cassettes is a database that uses the automatic Attacca annotation system in order to comprehensively annotate gene-cassettes and transposable elements in a stream-lined manner and to discover novel gene cassettes. Antibiotic resistance is often due to horizontal gene transfer, which allows resistance to arise through cell-to-cell interaction. This poses a major challenge in the field of antibiotic resistance. Hence, the creation of RAC which would provide researchers a comprehensive and unique tool for the endeavor of documenting resistance due to gene-cassettes and transposable elements. Attacca helps discover novel gene cassettes when any three of the following occurs as mentioned in Tsafnat et al, 2011:

 the Attacca discovery heuristics (19) identify a gap in a cassette array that could correspond to a novel cassette;
 a cassette encoding a potentially novel β-lactamase variant is detected; or
 the type of sequence submitted (e.g. isolated cassette) suggests that a gene cassette should be present but a gene cassette is not found by Attacca.

If any of these cases occur, the gene-cassette would be sent to review at the Centre for Infectious Diseases and Microbiology, University of Sydney for further examination.

See also 

 Antimicrobial Resistance databases

References 

Antimicrobial resistance organizations
Biological databases